'Nightlife' was the third single to be taken from IAMX's second studio album 'The Alternative'.  It was co-written with his girlfriend at the time Sue Denim.

The song also features in the German vampire film Wir Sind Die Nacht (We Are The Night), and is on the film's soundtrack.

Track listing

2006 songs
IAMX songs
Songs written by Chris Corner